The 201st Airlift Squadron flies Boeing C-40 Clipper. It is a unit of the District of Columbia Air National Guard. Its parent unit is the 113th Wing.

Mission
The 201st Airlift Squadron provides short notice worldwide transportation for the Executive Branch, Congressional Members, Department of Defense officials and high-ranking U.S. and foreign dignitaries using the C-40C aircraft.

History
The history of the 201st Airlift Squadron began in 1946 with the activation of "H" Flight, HQ, District of Columbia Air National Guard.  Operating out of Hangar 15 on the East side of Andrews Air Force Base, "H" Flight's assortment of B-26, C-47, C-53 and F-51 aircraft provided passenger airlift capabilities to the Air National Guard.

In 1954 "H" Flight was re-designated as Detachment 1, HQ, District of Columbia Air National Guard.  Over the next 38 years Detachment 1 employed more than 20 different types of aircraft to provide worldwide airlift support for both military and civilian passengers.  Detachment 1 provided airlift support for large military teams as well as small command groups.  The detachment also provided transportation for distinguished passengers such as the vice president, congressional and cabinet members, service secretaries and local civic leaders.  In 1984, Detachment 1 relocated to its current location on the West side of Andrews Air Force Base.

On 20 June 1992, Detachment 1 was re-designated as the 201st Airlift Squadron, District of Columbia Air National Guard.  Today the 201st Airlift Squadron continues to carry on the work that was started with "H" Flight in 1946.  The continuing efforts to upgrade and expand the squadron's worldwide capabilities led to the acquisition of C-38As in 1998 and C-40Cs (Boeing 737) in 2002. The 201st retired their C-38A fleet in 2015, handing the aircraft off to the United States Navy.

The events of 11 September 2001 marked a turning point in the history of the squadron.  The Global War on Terrorism brought a new emphasis on worldwide VIP travel.  Since that date, the 201st Airlift Squadron's operational tempo has increased dramatically, with the majority of missions overseas.  With its current complement of C-40Cs, the squadron provides worldwide air transportation for the executive branch, congressional members, Department of Defense and high-ranking U.S. and foreign dignitaries.

Assignments

Major command
Air National Guard/Air Mobility Command (1992–Present)

Previous designations
201st Airlift Squadron (1995–Present)

Bases stationed
Andrews Air Force Base (???-Present)

Aircraft operated

Douglas C-47 Skytrain	1946-1967
Douglas B-26 Invader	1946-1972
Douglas C-53 Skytrooper	1946-1958
North American P-51 Mustang	1954
North American F-86 Sabre	1954-1957
Beech C-45 Expeditor	1954-1960
Lockheed T-33	1954-1987
Cessna LC-126	1955-1956
Beechcraft L-23 Seminole	1955-1962 reclassified as U-8 (1963)
De Havilland Canada L-20 Beaver	1957
Convair T-29	1958-1975
Hiller H-23 Raven	1960-1963
Douglas C-54 Skymaster	1965-1967
Cessna U-3A	1969-1972
Lockheed C-121 Constellation	1969-1972
Cessna O-2B Skymaster	1974
Convair C-131 Samaritan	1975-1978
Boeing T-43A	1978-1985
North American T-39 Sabreliner	1981-1987
Boeing C-22B	1986-2004
Learjet C-21A	1987-1998
Gulfstream C-38A Courier	1998–2015
Boeing C-40C Clipper	2004–Present

Notes

References
 201st Airlift Squadrons Historical Archives, Menoher Drive, Andrews AFB MD.

External links

201st Airlift Squadron factsheet
201st AS on www.globalsecurity
113th Wing
https://web.archive.org/web/20080514061656/http://www.boeing-c22b.org/

Squadrons of the United States Air National Guard
201
Military units and formations in Maryland